Yoshihisa Iwashita (born 13 June 1949) is a Japanese professional golfer.

Iwashita played on the Japan Golf Tour, winning once.

Professional wins (1)

Japan Golf Tour wins (1)

Japan Golf Tour playoff record (0–2)

External links

Japanese male golfers
Japan Golf Tour golfers
Sportspeople from Shizuoka Prefecture
1949 births
Living people